Anne of the Island is the third book in the Anne of Green Gables series, written by Lucy Maud Montgomery about Anne Shirley.
Anne Of the Island is the third book of the eight-book sequels written by L. M. Montgomery, about Anne Shirley and her friends. In the book, Anne leaves Green Gables for the first time to go to Redmond College to get a bachelor's degree in art at the age of 18.

The book was published in 1915, after the first two books. On top of that, Anne's growth is reflected in the book's title. She finds herself recognizing Prince Edward Island as her true home when studying away from the Island, particularly when visiting the site where she was born. She has stated several times that she is not a "Bluenose", as individuals born in Nova Scotia are known, and that she is a true Islander.

Anne of the Island was published in 1915, seven years after the bestselling Anne of Green Gables. In the continuing story of Anne Shirley, Anne attends Redmond College in Kingsport, where she is studying for her BA.

Plot summary 
Anne Shirley is looking forward to new adventures as she packs her stuff, bids farewell to childhood, and prepares to enroll at Redmond College. Anne nestles her memories of rural Avonlea aside and experiences life on her own terms, full of surprises... such as a marriage proposal from the worst guy she's ever met, the sale of her first tale, and a tragedy that teaches her a harsh lesson. Anne tucks away her memories of idyllic Avonlea and discovers the life waiting for her in the bustling metropolis of Kingsport, with her old friend Prissy Grant waiting for her and her frivolous new friend Philippa Gordon by her side.

In addition, Anne submits a short piece to numerous periodicals, but it is rejected, and she swears she will never write again. Worse news arrives when she returns to Avonlea and discovers that Ruby, her consumptive pal, is dying. While Ruby is sick, Anne stays with her and is persuaded to keep writing by Ruby's guidance.
Anne leaves Green Gables and her work as a teacher in Avonlea to pursue her original dream (which she gave up in Anne of Green Gables) of taking further education at Redmond College in Kingsport, Nova Scotia. Gilbert Blythe and Charlie Sloane enroll as well, as does Anne's friend from Queen's Academy, Priscilla Grant. During her first week of school, Anne befriends Philippa Gordon, a beautiful girl whose frivolous ways charm her. Philippa (Phil for short) also happens to be from Anne's birthplace in Bolingbroke, Nova Scotia.

The girls spend their first year in boardinghouses and decide to set up house thereafter in a lovely cottage called Patty's Place, near campus. Meanwhile, Anne's childhood friend Ruby Gillis dies of consumption (tuberculosis) very soon after finding her own true love. The girls enter their second year at Redmond happily ensconced at Patty's Place, along with Queen's classmate Stella Maynard and her "Aunt Jimsie" (their chaperone), while life continues in Avonlea. Diana Barry marries Fred Wright and Davy and Dora continue to keep Marilla busy.

Midway through their college years, Gilbert Blythe, who has always loved Anne, proposes to her but Anne rejects him; although she and Gilbert are very close, she holds sentimental fantasies about true love (all featuring a tall, dark, handsome, inscrutable hero) and does not recognize her true feelings for Gilbert. Gilbert leaves, his heart broken, and the two drift apart.

Anne later welcomes the courtship of Roy Gardner, a darkly handsome Redmond student who showers her with attention and poetic gestures. However, when he proposes after two years, Anne abruptly realizes that Roy does not really belong in her life, and that she had only been in love with the idea of him as the embodiment of her childhood ideal.

Anne is so ashamed in how she treated Roy that she feels her entire Redmond experience may have been spoiled. She returns to Green Gables, a "full-fledged B.A.", but finds herself a bit lonely. Diana gives birth to her first child, and Jane Andrews, an old school friend, marries a Winnipeg millionaire. Having received an offer to be the principal of the Summerside school in the Autumn, Anne is keeping herself occupied over the summer when she learns that Gilbert is gravely ill with typhoid fever. With shock, Anne finally realizes how deep her true feelings for Gilbert are, and endures a white night of fear that he will leave this world without knowing that she does care. In the morning, Anne gratefully learns that Gilbert will survive. Gilbert recovers over the summer, bolstered by a letter from Phil assuring him that there is really nothing between Anne and Roy. After several visits to Green Gables, Gilbert and Anne take a late summer walk in Hester Gray's garden, and finally become engaged.

Title 
The title of the book reflects the development of Anne. While studying away from Prince Edward Island and in particular when visiting the place of her birth, she finds herself identifying the Island as her true home. Several times, she denies being a "Bluenose", as those born in Nova Scotia were nicknamed, and considers herself an Islander to the core.

Characters 
Anne Shirley - Now a student at Redmond College, Anne has become an elegant, smart young woman.

Marilla Cuthbert - The stern, upright woman who took Anne in when she was just a girl. She lives at Green Gables with the twins, Davy and Dora Keith who are the orphaned children of her dead third cousin.

Gilbert Blythe - Anne's childhood rival and now good friend. Gilbert is now studying at Redmond College and is in Anne's class. After many years, he finally admits his love for Anne and proposes to her. He is rejected the first time but after falling ill and proposing again Anne accepts it.

Charlie Sloane - An old schoolmate who has feelings for Anne, but who Anne has always felt indifferent towards and is now in her class at Redmond College.  He proposes to Anne but is rejected.

Priscilla Grant - Anne's friend from Queen's Academy, Priscilla is one of Anne's roommates at Patty's Place.

Stella Maynard - Anne's friend from Queen's Academy, Stella is one of Anne's roommates at Patty's Place.

Philippa Gordon - Anne's new friend from Redmond College, Philippa (or Phil for short) is playful and charming and can't choose between her beaus. However, she is also a loyal friend and plays an essential role in bringing Anne and Gilbert together at the end. 
 
Roy Gardner - A handsome Redmond student who Anne at first thinks is her dream man having become friends after he shared his umbrella with her. He courts Anne for two years. Anne is at first enamoured by his romantic gestures, but eventually finds him rather dull and humourless and rejects his proposal.

Diana Barry - Anne's kindred spirit since childhood. The two remain best friends, even as Diana marries and starts a family.

Davy Keith - One of the twins who Marilla took in, Davy is mischievous but sweet at heart, and idolizes Anne. He has fair, fuzzy ringlets all over his head, one dimple, roguish hazel eyes, a snub nose and is often smiling.

Dora Keith - Dora, Davy's sister, is completely the contrary of her brother. She does everything she is told without mistake and is very docile. She has sleek curls, hazel eyes, a straight nose and "prunes and prisms" mouth.

Rachel Lynde - Formerly Marilla and Anne's neighbour, who has since moved to Green Gables after the death of her husband Thomas. While she is outspoken and demanding, she is well-intentioned and kindhearted.

Ruby Gillis - Anne's childhood friend. Ruby is fair and beautiful and prepared to marry when she discovers that she is gravely ill and dies later in the book.

Jane Andrews - Anne's childhood friend. Jane is a teacher who meets and marries an older millionaire, much to Mrs. Andrews' delight.

Billy Andrews - Jane's slow-witted brother, who is Anne's first proposal. Too bashful to go courting, he uses his sister as an intermediary. Anne is disappointed but amused at how unromantic the whole situation is and she rejects him.

Series
Montgomery continued the story of Anne Shirley in a series of sequels. They are listed in the order of Anne's age in each novel.

Adaptations 
The last two episodes of the six-part miniseries Anne of Avonlea (1975), starring Kim Braden, are based on Anne of the Island.

The second act of the musical Anne & Gilbert is based on Anne of the Island. The first act is based on Anne of Avonlea.

The television mini-series Anne of Green Gables: The Sequel (1987), starring Megan Follows, was largely inspired by this book.

External links

 
 
 Anne and Gilbert, The Musical A new musical based on Anne and Gilbert's romance in Anne of the Island.
 L.M. Montgomery Online Formerly the L.M. Montgomery Research Group, this site includes a blog, extensive lists of primary and secondary materials, detailed information about Montgomery's publishing history, and a filmography of screen adaptations of Montgomery texts. See, in particular, the page about Anne of the Island.
 The L.M. Montgomery Literary Society This site includes information about Montgomery's works and life and research from the newsletter, The Shining Scroll.
 
 https://web.archive.org/web/20130609073943/http://www.anneandgilbert.ca/

References

Anne of Green Gables books
1915 Canadian novels
Novels by Lucy Maud Montgomery
Novels set in Nova Scotia
1915 children's books
Canadian children's books
Canadian children's novels